The Museum of Glass (MOG) is a 75,000-square-foot (7,000 m²) contemporary art museum in Tacoma, Washington, dedicated to the medium of glass. Since its founding in 2002, the Museum of Glass has been committed to creating a space for the celebration of the studio glass movement through nurturing artists, implementing education, and encouraging creativity.

History 
The idea for the Museum of Glass began in 1992 when Dr. Philip M. Phibbs, recently retired president of the University of Puget Sound, had a conversation with Tacoma native and renowned glass artist Dale Chihuly. Phibbs reasoned that the Pacific Northwest’s contributions to the studio glass movement warranted a glass museum, and he outlined a plan for the Museum of Glass to the Executive Council for a Greater Tacoma. The timing of his proposal corresponded with the idea to redevelop the Thea Foss Waterway, an industrial site. The chairman of the council, George Russel, concluded that the Museum of Glass would be the perfect anchor for the renewed waterway.

The site for the museum, directly adjacent to the Thea Foss Waterway, was secured in 1995. The Museum of Glass was established as a nonprofit organization in 1996. Canadian architect Arthur Erickson was chosen to design the museum's building in 1997. Construction of the museum began in June 2000, and the steel frame of the iconic hot-shop cone was completed in 2001. Shortly thereafter construction began on the Chihuly Bridge of Glass to link the museum to downtown Tacoma. The museum opened on July 6, 2002, to thousands of visitors and worldwide accolades.

Since its opening, the Museum of Glass has become a collecting institution, and has introduced a mobile hot-shop.

Architecture 

The Museum of Glass was designed by Canadian architect Arthur Erickson and was his first major art museum in the United States. The museum totals 75,000 square feet (7,000 m²) in area, featuring 13,000 square feet (1,200 m²) in gallery space and a 7,000-square-foot (650 m²) hot shop. This hot shop, shaped as an angled cone, is the museum’s most striking architectural feature. The cone, inspired by the wood "beehive burners" of the sawmills that once dotted the waterway, is composed of 2,800 diamond-shaped stainless steel panels and is 100 feet (30 m) in diameter at its base. Also featured in the Museum of Glass’ architecture are a sweeping concrete stairway that spirals around the exterior of the building, and three rimless reflecting pools featured on the museum’s terraces. Connected to the museum is the Chihuly Bridge of Glass, designed by Arthur Erickson in collaboration with artist Dale Chihuly, to connect the Museum of Glass to downtown Tacoma.

Exhibitions

Permanent collections 
 20th and 21st Century Glass Collection  
 Kids Design Glass Collection 
 Visiting Artist Residency Program Collection 
 Cappy Thompson: Gathering the Light

Current exhibitions 
"Beyond the Hot Shop: Glass in a Digital Age" | January 29, 2020May 2020
 Joey Kirkpatrick and Flora C. Mace: Every Soil Bears Not Everything | September 23, 2015September 6, 2016  
 #BeTheCurator | January 16October 23, 2016 
 David Huchthausen: A Retrospective Selection | July 23, 2016January 8, 2017 
 David Willis: Daisies | May 4, 2016August 2016

Past exhibitions 

 Chihuly's Venetians: The George R. Stroemple Collection | July 25, 2015January 4, 2016 
 Vanity | March 4, 2015August 30, 2015 
 Treasures from Glass Collectors | July 13, 2015September 7, 2015 
 Tools of the Trade | July 13, 2015September 7, 2015 
 Kids Design Glass Too | January 17, 2015July 12, 2015 
 Chihuly Drawings | March 1, 2015June 30, 2015 
 Patra Passage | February 14, 2015May 10, 2015 
 Look! See? The Colors and Letters of Jen Elek and Jeremy Bert | February 7, 2014February 1, 2015 
 Coastal Alchemy - Anna Skibska and Associates | February 22, 2014February 8, 2015 
 Lightness of Being - New Sculpture - Howard Ben Tré | September 13, 2014January 4, 2015 
 Hilltop Artists 20th Anniversary | September 13, 2014February 1, 2015 
 Celebrating Lino Tagliapietra | September 24, 2014January 18, 2015 
 Iittala Birds by Toikka | September 24, 2014February 22, 2015 
 Bohemian Boudoir | January 15 – May 4, 2014 
 Links: Australian Glass and the Pacific Northwest | May 17, 2013 – January 26, 2014 
 An Experiment in Design Production: The Enduring Birds of Iittala | September 25, 2013 – January 12, 2014 
 Northwest Artists Collect | January 19, 2012 – October 27, 2013 
 Translucent: Benjamin Moore | February 16, 2012 October 20, 2013 
 Outgrowth: Highlights from the Museum’s Collections | February 9, 2013 April 21, 2013 
 Origins: Early Works by Dale Chihuly | May 19 October 21, 2012 
 Beauty Beyond Nature: The Glass Art of Paul Stankard | November 12, 2011 July 1, 2012 
 Gathering: John Miller and Friends | October 29, 2011 June 19, 2012 
 Mildred Howard: Parenthetically Speaking: It’s Only a Figure of Speech | July 2, 2011 April 29, 2012 
 Glimmering Gone: Ingalena Klenell and Beth Lipman | Oct. 23, 2010 March 11, 2012 
 Peter Serko: Transformation: Art Changes a City | August 7, 2011 January 8, 2012 
 Kids Design Glass | October 31, 2009 October 30, 2011 
 Fertile Ground: Recent Masterworks from the Visiting Artist Residency Program | October 9, 2010 October 16, 2011 
 Masters of Studio Glass: Richard Craig Meitner | July 17, 2010 June 19, 2011 
 Preston Singletary: Echoes, Fire, and Shadows | July 11, 2009 September 19, 2010 
 Incoming: Selections from the Permanent Collection | May 16, 2009 July 5, 2010 
 Contrasts: A Glass Primer | November 11, 2006 October 11, 2009 
 White Light: Glass Compositions by Daniel Clayman | September 14, 2008 June 14, 2009 
 Dale Chihuly: the Laguna Murano Chandelier | September 14, 2008 April 19, 2009 
 Dante Marioni: Form | Color | Pattern | February 16, 2008 March 8, 2009 
 Lino Tagliapietra in Retrospect: A Modern Renaissance in Italian Glass | February 23 August 24, 2008

Hot shop 
The Museum of Glass features a 7,000-square-foot (650 m²) hot shop amphitheater that provides seating for 145 guests to watch live glass blowing demonstrations. The hot shop contains both a hot glass studio for blowing and casting glass and a cold working studio. Hot shop activity is streamed live through the Museum of Glass’ website and is also archived online. The Museum of Glass hot shop also provides residencies for both visiting and featured artists.

Visiting Artist Program 

The Museum of Glass hosts internationally acclaimed and emerging artists through its Visiting Artist Residency Program. The residencies range in length from one day to several weeks, and a piece is selected from each residency for inclusion in the Museum’s collection. Most residencies are streamed online through the museum’s website and conclude in a Conversation with the Artist lecture. Since its opening, the Museum of Glass has partnered with Pilchuck Glass School to produce the Visiting Artist Summer Series in which artists who attend or work at Piilchuck are invited to a residency at the Museum of Glass. The first ever visiting artist to the Museum of Glass was Dale Chihuly at the museum’s opening in 2002.

References

External links

www.museumofglass.org

Art museums and galleries in Washington (state)
Museums in Tacoma, Washington
Art museums established in 2002
Glass museums and galleries in the United States
Museum of Glass
Museum of Glass